The list of Omega Psi Phi brothers (commonly referred to as Omegas or Ques) includes initiated and honorary members.

Omega Psi Phi was founded on November 17, 1911, at Howard University and incorporated under the laws of Washington D.C. on October 28, 1914.

Arts

Business

College Presidents

Entertainment

Military

Politics
{{mem/fstart
|ilist=

|alist=

Science

Sports

References

External links
Omega Psi Phi's official page Famous Omega Men
Paul Williams Architect

Further reading

brothers
Lists of members of United States student societies